Lior Lubin (born 19 September 1979) is an Israeli professional basketball coach and former national team player. He was born in Ramat Gan, Israel. In 2000, he was the Israeli Premier League Assists Leader. He is currently head coach for Hapoel Be'er Sheva of the Israeli Basketball Premier League.

References

External links
Eurobasket.com Profile
EuroLeague.net Profile
Basketball-Reference.com Profile

1970s births
Living people
Basketball coaches
Israeli basketball coaches
People from Safed